Rebecca Layla Blake (born 13 November 1998) is a Romanian cricketer and sport scientist who plays for the Romanian women's national cricket team as a right handed batter and offbreak bowler. She is presently the captain of the Romanian team, and has also captained the French national team.

On 9 September 2022, she captained Romania in her Women's Twenty20 International (WT20I) debut, against Greece. The following day, in a WT20I against Serbia, she became the first player to score a WT20I century for Romania.

Off the field, she works as a laboratory technician at Solent University in Southampton, England, and as a sport scientist for the GB Speedway Team.

Early life and education
Blake was born in Romania, to a Romanian mother, Greta, and an English father, John. She was raised in Romania, where she lived until she was nine years old, and in France. At the age of 11, she was introduced to cricket, in the form of an impromptu France v Rest of the World game at a picnic.

As a child, Blake also enjoyed horse riding, but had little time for it after starting high school. Additionally, she played basketball and handball with friends. However, she preferred cricket: "It is both a collective and individual discipline," she told  in 2014.

In her mid-teens, Blake lived in the tiny village of Miremont, between Thouars and Bressuire in the Deux-Sèvres department, western France, and attended Lycée Aliénor d'Aquitaine in Poitiers.

Between 2017 and 2020, she studied at Solent University in Southampton, England, for a Bachelor of Science with honours in Applied Sport Science. In 2021, she completed a Master of Science in Sport Science and Performance Coaching from the same university. She also has an England and Wales Cricket Board (ECB) Level 2 cricket coaching qualification and is qualified as a gym instructor.

In early 2022, she was said to be "in the process of organising a doctorate".

Domestic career
Inspired by her introduction to cricket as an 11 year old, Blake joined the Saumur Cricket Club. She soon became the youngest and only girl player, and a regular, in the club's only team, which was otherwise a men's team. Later, she played for the Nantes Cricket Club.

In 2017, she moved to the Hursley Park Cricket Club in Hampshire, England, for which she played initially in the Women's 2nd XI, alongside Shami Mosweu, captain of the Botswana national team. In September 2019, she was a member of the Hursley Park team led by Emily Windsor that won the inaugural Summer Smash T10 tournament at The Oval in South London.

As of her WT20I debut in September 2022, she was still a member of the Hursley Park club.

International career

France
Blake's batting and bowling feats for Saumur soon came to the attention of the French national squad's selectors. In August 2011, aged 12, she played her first two matches for the French national team, against Jersey; the two contests were also the first matches ever played by the team, of which she was the youngest member. In the first match, Blake and the team did not do well, but in the second, she took two wickets and was given the best bowler award. Once again, she soon became a team regular.

By August 2014, when the then 15-year-old Blake played in that year's annual European women's cricket tournament at the Olympic Stadium in Berlin, she had become one of her team's vice-captains, and was being described as "the French teen star". The previous month, she had scored her maiden international half century, against Belgium.

At the tournament, contested between seven teams, Blake opened her account with 30* in France's defeat by host team Germany. In her final match, against Gibraltar, she contributed 31 runs to a "comfortable victory" by her team. France bagged a total of three 'upset' wins, against Jersey, Denmark and Gibraltar, and finished "an unexpected third", behind Italy and Germany. Along the way, Blake made 94 runs and took six wickets in six matches; she was also named as the tournament's leading Emerging Player, and was ranked sixth Most Valuable Player from more than 90 participants.

In an interview with The Deux-Sèvres Monthly published shortly after the tournament, Blake said:

In 2016, Blake was appointed captain of the French team, replacing Sharon Whiting, who had retired. At that time, she was hailed as having "perfect knowledge of the game". In five tournament matches, France went through undefeated, including against favourites Germany and Italy, and thus achieved "... the unthinkable by winning the gold medal".

When Blake moved to England in 2017, she ceased to be eligible for selection in the French team.

Romania
Blake was always eligible to play cricket for Romania, but for a long time that country had no women's team. Eventually, she was informed through Facebook that Cricket Romania was setting up such a team and wanted to discuss the team's plans with her. About a year later, she was playing cricket in Romania.

On 9 September 2022, Blake made her Women's Twenty20 International (WT20I) debut, as captain of the Romanian team against Greece, in the first match of the three team Women's Balkan Cup 2022 tournament at the Moara Vlasiei Cricket Ground, Ilfov County, Romania. Although she was top scorer for the match with 38 runs in 40 balls, Greece emerged as the victor, by eight wickets.

The following day, in a WT20I against Serbia, Blake became the first player to score a WT20I century for Romania when she made 110* in 61 balls, with 17 fours, to lead the team to its first ever victory, by 145 runs. She was also named as player of the match. Romania was involved in two matches on the next day, 11 September 2022. In the first match, a playoff against Serbia for third place in the tournament, the team won by seven wickets, with Blake taking 2/7 and scoring 20*. In the second match, the tournament final, Blake made 49 in 34 balls, in Romania's defeat by Greece by 10 wickets.

As of the end of the tournament, Blake had played four WT20Is, and had a batting average of 108.50 at a strike rate of 148.63. During an interview for a podcast in October 2022, she said that she was hoping to play more matches for Romania.

Playing style
Blake is a right handed batter and offbreak bowler.

Off the field
Blake is known to her friends and fellow cricketers as "Becky" or "Becks".

She has worked as a part-time cricket coach for Game Changers Coaching, a private coaching business, and for Sandroyd School in Wiltshire, England.

Since 2020, she has been a part time sport scientist for the GB Speedway Team. In that capacity, she monitors the progress, and assists with the development, of speedway riders; in particular, she collects, analyses and reports on telemetric data with the objective of maximising riders' performance.

In 2021–22, she was a full-time student hub advisor for the University of Southampton, England. In October 2022, she commenced working full time as a Laboratory Technician (Sport Science) at Solent University.

See also 
 List of centuries in women's Twenty20 International cricket
 List of Romania women Twenty20 International cricketers

References

External links 
 
 
 The Umpire Strikes Back podcast: European Adventures & Remembering SK Warne  – includes interview of Blake about playing for Romania

Living people
1998 births
French cricketers

Romania women Twenty20 International cricketers

Speedway in the United Kingdom
Alumni of Solent University
Academics of Solent University
Romanian people of English descent